Opuntia phaeacantha is a species of prickly pear cactus known by the common names brown-spine prickly pear, tulip prickly pear,  and desert prickly pear found across the southwestern United States, lower Great Plains, and northern Mexico. The plant forms dense but localized thickets. Several varieties of this particular species occur, and it may hybridize with other prickly pears, making identification sometimes tricky.

Description
Opuntia phaeacantha has a mounding habit of flattened green pads. The pads are protected by clusters of spines. Each cluster bearing 1-4 spines. The spines are brown, reddish-brown, yellowish, or gray, usually darker brownish toward the base than the tip, and often over 3 cm in length. At the base of the spine cluster is a round tuft of easily detached yellowish to reddish or brown bristles called Glochids. Glochids are also present on the fruit. This is the source for the plants common name "prickly pear".

The flowers are bright yellow with a pale green to orange or red center. In some regions occasional plants may produce flowers of other colors such as orange, pink, or magenta. The edible fruits are usually red or purple with a pink seedy flesh. The fruit has a mild watermelon or pear flavor. Both the fruit and the fleshy pads provide an important food resource for desert wildlife.

This plant, like other Opuntia species, is attacked by cactus moth.

Other common names for this species, and ones which are now considered variants of this species, include plateau prickly-pear, New Mexico prickly-pear, and Kingman prickly-pear.

The species is widespread, from California south to Mexico and the Southwest United States. There are multiple variations and  perhaps these will be described as varieties or full species some day.

Uses 
The cactus can be prepared as food in a similar fashion to Opuntia humifusa.

References

External links
Opuntia phaeacantha Photo Gallery 1
Opuntia phaeacantha Photo Gallery 2
Jepson Manual Treatment: Opuntia phaeacantha

phaeacantha
Cacti of Mexico
Cacti of the United States
Flora of Northwestern Mexico
Flora of the Great Basin
Flora of the Great Plains (North America)
Flora of the Southwestern United States
Flora of the California desert regions
Flora of the Chihuahuan Desert
Flora of the Sonoran Deserts
Flora of California
Flora of Kansas
Flora of New Mexico
Flora of Oklahoma
Flora of the Sierra Nevada (United States)
Flora of Texas
Natural history of the California chaparral and woodlands
Natural history of the Mojave Desert
Flora of the Mexican Plateau
North American desert flora
Desert fruits